Collins Pennie (born June 20, 1985) is an American actor. He is known for his roles in Prom Night as Ronnie Heflin, and in In Time as Time Keeper Jaeger. He also starred in the films Fame and Stomp the Yard: Homecoming.

Early life 
Pennie was born in Fort Greene, Brooklyn. He is of Trinidadian descent.

Career 
Born in Brooklyn, New York, Pennie began his career with roles on NBC's hit drama Law & Order and as a drug-addicted thief on Without a Trace. His television work quickly caught the eye of Ford Model Management, who signed Pennie,  leading him to a successful "ck one" fragrance campaign for Calvin Klein.

Pennie currently resides in Los Angeles, New York and Atlanta. While not on camera, he spends most of his time dancing, writing and mastering his many crafts.

Pennie hit the stage in the summer of 2010, appearing in Rent with actors Neil Patrick Harris and Wayne Brady, performing in a three-day limited engagement at the Hollywood Bowl. Pennie's prolific dance moves also landed him the lead male role in Beyonce's "Run the World (Girls)" video, which was released May 18, 2011.

Pennie has also continued to work in film, appearing in Ryan Fleck's award-winning Half Nelson (2007) opposite Ryan Gosling and Shareeka Epps. He had lead roles in Prom Night (2008) and the musical Fame (2009), an adaptation of the 1980 cult classic. In 2010, Collins had the lead role in Stomp the Yard: Homecoming, in which he played Chance Harris, a college student struggling to balance between his school, work, relationships and opportunity to perform in the national step competition. On television, Collins starred on the hit series hospital drama Hawthorne, where he worked alongside Jada Pinkett Smith and Michael Vartan. He also appeared in the Fox Feature film In Time, starring opposite Justin Timberlake, Amanda Seyfried and Cillian Murphy. In early 2013 Collins made his return to television in Regina King's directorial debut, Let The Church Say Amen. The film was based on ReShonda Tate Billingley's 2005 novel of the same name. Royal Ties, the company King runs with her sister, Reina King, produced this film for BET Networks alongside Queen Latifah's Flava Unit Company.

Television 
In 2004, Pennie made his television debut on the long-running NBC crime-drama Law & Order. He has since starred on other television shows such as Without a Trace, and played Marcus Leeds in the hospital drama Hawthorne.

Film 

Pennie has appeared in Half Nelson (2007), the 2008 version of Prom Night,  and the musical Fame, an adaptation of the 1980 cult classic. In 2010, he had the lead role in Stomp the Yard: Homecoming. In 2011, he appeared in the film In Time, starring Justin Timberlake and Amanda Seyfried.

In September 2012, Pennie will star in actress Regina King's directorial debut Let The Church Say Amen which is adapted from ReShonda Tate Billingsley's 2005 best-selling novel. The film will premiered on BET in 2013.

Theater 
In the summer of 2010, Pennie appeared in Rent with actors Neil Patrick Harris and Wayne Brady in a three-day limited engagement at the Hollywood Bowl.

Music video 
Pennie played the lead male role in Beyoncé's "Run The World (Girls)" video, which was released 18 May 2011 on Beyoncé's website and American Idol.

Filmography

References

External links

1985 births
American male actors
African-American male actors
Living people
People from Fort Greene, Brooklyn
21st-century African-American people
20th-century African-American people